The Saint Boniface church  is a church in Leeuwarden, the Netherlands.

History
The Gothic revival church was designed by Pierre Cuypers and built between 1882 and 1884.
In the Church dedicated to Saint Boniface is a pipe organ built by the French organ builder Aristide Cavaillé-Coll. The organ was originally built for the Saint Willibrord College in Katwijk

The church is part of the Roman Catholic Diocese of Groningen-Leeuwarden

External links

 Catholic Diocese of Groningen-Leeuwarden
 Official site of the Stichting Bonifatiustoren.

Churches in Leeuwarden
Rijksmonuments in Leeuwarden